National Highway 753A, commonly referred to as NH 753A is a national highway in  India. It is a spur road of National Highway 53. NH-753A traverses the state of Maharashtra in India.

Route 
Malkapur, Buldhana, Chikhli, Deulgaon Raja, Jalna, Aurangabad.

Junctions  

  Terminal near Malkapur.
  near Buldhana.
  near Chikhli.
  near Deulgaon Raja.
  near Jalna
  near Jalna
  near Jalna
  Terminal near Aurangabad.

See also 

 List of National Highways in India
 List of National Highways in India by state

References

External links 

 NH 753A on OpenStreetMap

National highways in India
National Highways in Maharashtra